Tamara Grigoryevna  Lobova (1911 — 2007) was a Soviet cinematographer who was one of the first women to take up the trade. She was married to fellow cinematographer Anatoli Golovnya, and the pair shot many films together. She was a laureate of the Stalin Prize, second degree (1951).

Selected filmography 

 Heart Does Not Forgive (1961)
 The Dragonfly (1954)
 Zhukovsky (1950)
 Admiral Nakhimov (1947)
 Invisible Jan (1942)
 Fighting Film Collection No. 6 (1941)
 General Suvorov (1941)
 Minin and Pozharsky (1939)
 Ruslan and Ludmila (1938)
 No Mistake (1935)

References

External links 
 

Soviet cinematographers
Soviet women cinematographers
1911 births
2007 deaths
Women film pioneers
Gerasimov Institute of Cinematography alumni
Academic staff of the Gerasimov Institute of Cinematography
Stalin Prize winners